"New Paths to Helicon, Pt. 1" (almost always referred to as "Helicon 1") is a song by Scottish band Mogwai. It was first released as a double A-side with "New Paths to Helicon, Pt. 2" on 7" limited to 3,000 copies. It was later included on the 1997 compilation album, Ten Rapid (Collected Recordings 1996-1997). The single reached #2 in English radio presenter John Peel's Festive Fifty Chart in 1997.
The single's cover art shows details from the McMinnville UFO photographs.

Overview

"Helicon 1" is a regular part of Mogwai set lists. A live version of the song (recorded by Steve Lamacq from a BBC Radio Session at Maida Vale in March 1999) can be found on Mogwai's 2005 live compilation album, Government Commissions: BBC Sessions 1996-2003, as well as UK music magazine Select'''s 2000 compilation CD, The Deep End. Another live version of "Helicon 1" (recorded at Rothesay Pavilion, Isle of Bute on 14 April 2001) can be found as B-sides on the Australian, New Zealand and Japanese releases of the "My Father My King" single, as well as the 2001 UK/European Tour EP. When the song is played live, Stuart Braithwaite and Dominic Aitchison switch instruments, Aitchison playing guitar, and Braithwaite on bass, usually sitting down. Braithwaite has commented on this:

Musical composition
The song begins with almost inaudible guitar, heavily delayed and reverberated, playing a descending three note melody. At (0:25), a bass riff (based around the chords of D major and B minor) enters. At (1:00), slightly distorted, heavily delayed and reverberated guitars begin playing along to the bass riff, swooping in and out. At (1:34), a relaxed, slow drum beat begins. At (2:50), all of the instruments pause for a brief second, then explode into loud guitar-driven noise, backed by a steady, heavy drumbeat (to which every snare drum beat is accompanied by a tambourine clash). At (4:28), the distorted guitars and drums end, leaving the soft bass riff to close the song, aided by the guitar melody heard at the start of song, all of which gradually fade out.

Live versions of the song are performed at a substantially slower tempo.

Media usage
 In 2002, the song was featured in "Dragonchasers", an episode of the American crime drama The Shield.
 In 2006, the song was featured in "Wind Sprints", an episode of the American serial drama Friday Night Lights.
 In 2018, the song was featured in the film and trailer for "Beautiful Boy."

Music video
Almost two decades since the single was first released, an official music video was produced for "Helicon 1," directed by Craig Murray. The video premiered on Vice Media's Noisey music channel on June 24, 2015, as an advance promotion for Central Belters'', a 3-disc retrospective marking Mogwai's 20th anniversary as a band.

Personnel
 Stuart Braithwaite – bass guitar
 Dominic Aitchison – guitar
 John Cummings – guitar
 Martin Bulloch – drums
 Andy Miller – producer, mixer

Notes

External links
"Helicon 1" on Last.fm
"Helicon 1" Guitar Tablature
"Mogwai - "Helicon 1" (Official Music Video)" on YouTube

Mogwai songs
1997 singles
Rock instrumentals